WFWM is a public broadcast radio station headquartered at Frostburg State University in the Stangle Building. WFWM provides 24 hours of cultural and educational programming to the westernmost area of Maryland and adjacent areas of West Virginia and Pennsylvania.  WFWM's main transmitter is located on Dans Mountain in Midland, Maryland and operates at a frequency of 91.9 MHz.  A secondary transmitter is located in Oakland, Maryland and operates at a frequency of 96.3 MHz.

Some of WFWM's daily programming includes: locally produced programming and news as well as the public syndicate network of National Public Radio (NPR), the Associated Press, and National Weather Service. WFWM's musical programming includes: Classical, Jazz, Big Band, Blues, Celtic, Bluegrass, World, and Alternative, but most of its time is devoted to NPR and PRI news and talk programming and classical music. To provide experiential learning opportunities in radio operations for students, WFWM also hosts a student-run station called XFSR, Frostburg Student Radio. XFSR is an intranet radio station only broadcasting over the Frostburg State University network and not on the internet.

History
The station went on the air as WGTK on 1984-05-17.  On 1984-06-19, the station changed its call sign to the current WFWM.

Translators
In addition to the main station, WFWM is relayed by an additional translator to widen its broadcast area.

References

External links

FWM
FWM
NPR member stations
Radio stations established in 1984
1984 establishments in Maryland